Hamilton Apartments are two historic apartment buildings located at Lancaster, Lancaster County, Pennsylvania.  They were built in 1906, and are three-story brick and stone buildings.

The Historic Hamilton Suites in Lancaster, PA, sold for $3.1 million, or about $50,000 per unit, in a sale between private investors.

The 58-unit, 38,300-square-foot apartments were built for Hamilton L. Miller, a Chicago businessman, by contractor Herman Wohlsen in the Chicago commercial style, with some art nouveau details. It was the first large building in Lancaster used exclusively for apartments.  In 2009 the apartments, together with a small neighboring building, were sold for $3.1 million, or about $50,000 per unit, to a group that included Dan Kreider.

It was added to the National Register of Historic Places in 1984.

References

Residential buildings on the National Register of Historic Places in Pennsylvania
Residential buildings completed in 1906
Buildings and structures in Lancaster, Pennsylvania
Art Nouveau architecture in Pennsylvania
Art Nouveau apartment buildings
National Register of Historic Places in Lancaster, Pennsylvania
1906 establishments in Pennsylvania